Yannick Guillochon (born 2 June 1960) is a French former professional footballer who played as a defender and midfielder.

After football 
After retiring from the sport, Guillochon separated himself from the world of football, and became an entrepreneur. He started two construction companies.

Honours 
Paris Saint-Germain
 Coupe de France: 1982–83; runner-up: 1984–85

Individual
 France Football Best French Young Player: 1982–83

References

External links 
 
 

1960 births
Living people
Sportspeople from Saint-Germain-en-Laye
French footballers
Association football defenders
Association football midfielders
Stade Saint-Germain players
Paris Saint-Germain F.C. players
Le Havre AC players
Stade Rennais F.C. players
AS Poissy players
Ligue 1 players
Ligue 2 players
French Division 4 (1978–1993) players
French Division 3 (1971–1993) players
Footballers from Yvelines